Ragtag may refer to:

 Ragtag Cinema, a non-profit independent movie theater
 Ragtag Productions, an independent film company
 Ragtag (Agents of S.H.I.E.L.D.), a 2014 episode of American television series Agents of S.H.I.E.L.D.
 Project Ragtag, a cancelled Star Wars video game

See also

 Rag tag